Classical Antiquity is a biannual peer-reviewed academic journal that covers all topics pertaining to the field of classics, including Greek and Roman literature, history, archaeology, art, philosophy and philology, from the Bronze Age through Late Antiquity. It is published by the University of California Press on behalf of the Department of Classics of the University of California, Berkeley. The editor-in-chief is Mario Telo (University of California, Berkeley).

Abstracting and indexing
Arts & Humanities Citation Index
Current Contents/Arts and Humanities
British Humanities Index
International Bibliography of Periodical Literature
International Bibliography of Book Reviews of Scholarly Literature and Social Sciences
Russian Academy of Sciences Bibliographies
Scopus

External links
 
 Department of Classics, University of California, Berkeley

Classics journals
Publications established in 1982
University of California Press academic journals
1982 establishments in California
Biannual journals